Eric Kwakye Darfour is a Ghanaian politician and a member of the New Patriotic Party in Ghana. He is the Eastern Regional minister of Ghana. He was appointed by President Nana Addo Danquah Akuffo-Addo in January 2017 and was approved by the Members of Parliament in February 2017.

Early life and education 
He was born on the 29th day of September, 1957 in Achimota Accra.   He started his  basic education  at Obo Government School in Obo Kwahu his hometown.  After his middle school certificate he processed to St. John Grammar School and Ofori Panin Senior High for his 'O" Level And 'A' Level respectively.

In 1981, Kwakye Darfour studied in the University of Dakar, Senegal for a higher diploma in French  and later  acquired BA (HONS) in French and Linguistics from University of Ghana, Legon.

Political career 
He was elected after the Completion of the 2012 Ghanaian General Elections and reelected in 2017 after obtaining 73.48% of the total votes cast in the 2016 Ghanaian General Elections.

References

New Patriotic Party politicians
People from Eastern Region (Ghana)
Cheikh Anta Diop University alumni
University of Ghana alumni